Alexandroupoli railway station or Alexandroupoli Port railway station is the main railway station of Alexandroupoli in Eastern Macedonia and Thrace, Greece. Built-in the 1950s to combine the city's then-two stations, the current station is located in the city centre and acts as an interchange for services to Ormenio and Thessaloniki. Trains approaching from Thessaloniki must reverse for a few hundred meters to reach the station.

History
The central “French” station was opened in 1874, two years after the line from Alexandroupoli (then Dedeagac) to Istanbul via Edirne was completed. Built by the Chemins de fer Orientaux (CO), from Istanbul to Vienna. The railway reached Ftelia in 1873 when the line from Istanbul to Edirne and Bulgaria was opened. When the first station was built, the local rail network was self-contained within the Ottoman Empire. The “Poleos” Station would open later. Until 1909 there was no connection between the lines Istanbul–Alexandroupoli and Thessaloniki–Alexandroupoli (opened in 1896) at Alexandroupoli; a connection existed between Feres and Potamos (near current Avas).

During World War I, the railway was an important link for moving troops and equipment, as the Ottoman Empire, Bulgaria, and Austria-Hungary were all Central Allies. Following the defeat of the Ottoman Empire, its remaining imperial possessions were divided.

Under the Treaty of Lausanne of 1923, a new border between Greece and Turkey was established at the Evros river, just east of Ftelia railway station, which had the result that the railway from Istanbul to Bulgaria entered Greece at Pythio, then re-entered Turkey at Edirne (Karaağaç railway station), re-entered Greece at Marasia, and finally entered Bulgaria between Ormenio and Svilengrad.  This arrangement continued until 1971 when two new lines were opened. In Turkey, the Edirne Cut-off was opened to allow trains from Istanbul to Bulgaria to run through Edirne entirely on Turkish territory so that trains such as the Orient Express no longer passed through Ormenio. In Greece, a line was opened to allow trains from Pythio to Bulgaria to stay on Greek territory and avoid Edirne. In 1954 the CFFH was absorbed by the Hellenic State Railways.

29 April 1954 Alexandroupolis Railway Station was the setting for a formal visit by King Paul and then Prince Constantine. In 1958 the station was rebuilt in a more modern style. The following year, the station saw the arrival of German, the Patriarch of Serbia.

In 1971, the Hellenic State Railways was reorganised into the OSE taking over responsibilities for most of Greece's rail infrastructure. In the 1990s, OSE introduced the InterCity service to the Alexandroupoli–Svilengrad line Which reduced travel times across the whole line.

In 2001 the infrastructure element of OSE was created, known as GAIAOSE; it would henceforth be responsible for the maintenance of stations, bridges and other elements of the network, as well as the leasing and the sale of railway assists. In 2005, TrainOSE was created as a brand within OSE to concentrate on rail services and passenger interface. In 2009, with the Greek debt crisis unfolding OSE's Management was forced to reduce services across the network. Timetables were cut back, and routes closed as the government-run entity attempted to reduce overheads. Services from Feres to Alexandroupoli were cut back to three trains a day, reducing the reliability of services and passenger numbers. With passenger footfall in sharp decline. On 11 February 2011, all cross-border routes were closed, and international services (to Istanbul, Sofia, etc.) were ended. Thus, only two routes now connect Alexandroupoli with Thessaloniki and Athens (and those with a connection to Alex / Polis), while route time increased as the network was "upgraded". Services to/from Ormenio were replaced by a bus service. In 2014 TrainOSE replaced services to/from Dikaia with buses

In 2014 TrainOSE replaced services to/from Dikaia with buses In 2017 OSE's passenger transport sector was privatised as TrainOSE, currently a wholly owned subsidiary of Ferrovie dello Stato Italiane infrastructure, including stations remained under the control of OSE. In Late January 2020 a fire "accidentally" started when the possessions of a homeless man (who had found shelter within the courtyard of the station) caught fire for "unknown reason". It was reported that just 20 days later the station was repaired. In July 2022, the station began being served by Hellenic Train, the rebranded TrainOSE.

Facilities
The station has waiting rooms and a staffed booking office within a 1960s-era building (which was renovated in 2020 following a fire). There are toilets, parking and a Taxi rank also available, as well as bike racks. There is a disabled ramp leading up to the island platform, which is shielded by 1960s-era concrete canopies.

Services
The station is served by regional stopping services to Dikaia and Ormenio. InterCity trains also serve it to Thessaloniki.

On 30 December 2019, TrainOSE announced re-opening the Alexandroupoli-Ormenio route. However  it is reported that the timetable was cutback to just two services

There are currently no daytime through trains to/from Athens. International services such as the "Friendship Express" to Istanbul via  remains suspended since 2011. Also, there are currently no regular passenger services to Bulgaria.

Between July 2005 and February 2011 the Friendship Express, (an international InterCity train jointly operated by the Turkish State Railways (TCDD) and TrainOSE linking Istanbul's Sirkeci Terminal, Turkey and Thessaloniki, Greece) made scheduled stops at Central Station of Alexandroupoli.

Future
Alexandroupoli railway station and its port could see an upgrade if the plans for the Sea2Sea project go ahead.

See also
Railway stations in Greece
Hellenic Railways Organization
Hellenic Train

References

External links

 Alexandroupoli Station - National Railway Network Greek Travel Pages

Railway stations in Eastern Macedonia and Thrace
Railway stations opened in 1874
Buildings and structures in Evros (regional unit)
Alexandroupolis